The 1984 Campeonato Ecuatoriano de Fútbol de la Serie A was the 26th national championship for football teams in Ecuador.

Teams
The number of teams for this season was played by 14 teams.

First stage

Group A

Group B

Second stage

Group A

Group B

Triangular del No Descenso

Octogonal Final

References

External links
 Línea de Tiempo de eventos y partidos de Liga Deportiva Universitaria
 Calendario de partidos históricos de Liga Deportiva Universitaria
 Sistema de Consulta Interactiva y Herramienta de consulta interactiva de partidos de Liga Deportiva Universitaria

1984
Ecu